A mandrake is the root of a plant, historically derived either from plants of the genus Mandragora found in the Mediterranean region, or from other species, such as Bryonia alba, the English mandrake, which have similar properties. The plants from which the root is obtained are also called "mandrakes". Mediterranean mandrakes are perennial herbaceous plants with ovate leaves arranged in a rosette, a thick upright root, often branched, and bell-shaped flowers followed by yellow or orange berries. They have been placed in different species by different authors. They are highly variable perennial herbaceous plants with long thick roots (often branched) and almost no stem. They are usually either elliptical in shape or wider towards the end (obovate), with varying degrees of hairiness.

Because mandrakes contain deliriant hallucinogenic tropane alkaloids and the shape of their roots often resembles human figures, they have been associated with magic rituals throughout history, including present-day contemporary pagan traditions such as Wicca and Odinism.

The English name of the plant derives from Latin mandragora through French main-de-gloire. In German, it is known as alraune believed to mean 'all-rune' or 'elf-rune', referring to the plants folkloric ability to impart wisdom.

Toxicity
All species of Mandragora contain highly biologically active alkaloids, tropane alkaloids in particular. The alkaloids make the plant, in particular the root and leaves, poisonous, via anticholinergic, hallucinogenic, and hypnotic effects. Anticholinergic properties can lead to asphyxiation. Accidental poisoning is not uncommon. Ingesting mandrake root is likely to have other adverse effects such as vomiting and diarrhea. The alkaloid concentration varies between plant samples.  Clinical reports of the effects of consumption of Mediterranean mandrake include severe symptoms similar to those of atropine poisoning, including blurred vision, dilation of the pupils (mydriasis), dryness of the mouth, difficulty in urinating, dizziness, headache, vomiting, blushing and a rapid heart rate (tachycardia). Hyperactivity and hallucinations occurred in the majority of patients.

Folklore

The root is hallucinogenic and narcotic. In sufficient quantities, it induces a state of unconsciousness and was used as an anaesthetic for surgery in ancient times. In the past, juice from the finely grated root was applied externally to relieve rheumatic pains. It was used internally to treat melancholy, convulsions, and mania. When taken internally in large doses it was said to excite delirium and madness.

In the past, mandrake was often made into amulets which were believed to bring good fortune, cure sterility, etc. In one superstition, people who pull up this root will be condemned to hell, and the mandrake root would scream and cry as it was pulled from the ground, killing anyone who heard it. Therefore, in the past, people have tied the roots to the bodies of animals and then used these animals to pull the roots from the soil. This folklore reference is integrated into part of the portrayal of the fictional mandrake described in Harry Potter and the Chamber of Secrets (J. K. Rowling, 1998).

The ancient Greeks burned mandrake as incense.

In the Bible
A number of later translations into different languages follow Septuagint (and Vulgate) and use mandrake as the plant as the proper meaning in both the Book of Genesis 30:14–16 and Song of Songs 7:12-13. Others follow the example of the Luther Bible and provide a more literal translation.

In Genesis 30:14, Reuben, the eldest son of Jacob and Leah, finds mandrakes in a field. The trade offered by Rachel is for Leah to spend that night in Jacob's bed in exchange for Leah's . Leah gives away the plants to her barren sister, but soon after this (Genesis 30:14–22), Leah, who had previously had four sons but had been infertile for a long while, became pregnant once more and in time gave birth to two more sons, Issachar and Zebulun, and a daughter, Dinah. Only years after this episode of her asking for the mandrakes did Rachel manage to become pregnant.

Sir Thomas Browne, in Pseudodoxia Epidemica, ch. VII, suggested the duda'im of Genesis 30:14 is the opium poppy, because the word duda'im may be a reference to a woman's breasts.

The final verses of Chapter 7 of Song of Songs (Song of Songs 7:12–13), are:

Magic and witchcraft

According to the legend, when the root is dug up, it screams and kills all who hear it. Literature includes complex directions for harvesting a mandrake root in relative safety.
For example, Josephus (circa 37–100 AD) of Jerusalem gives the following directions for pulling it up:

Excerpt from Chapter XVI, "Witchcraft and Spells", of Transcendental Magic: Its Doctrine and Ritual by nineteenth-century occultist and ceremonial magician Eliphas Levi:

The following is taken from Jean-Baptiste Pitois' The History and Practice of Magic:

In Medieval times, mandrake was considered a key ingredient in a multitude of witches' flying ointment recipes as well as a primary component of magical potions and brews. These were entheogenic preparations used in European witchcraft for their mind-altering and hallucinogenic effects. Starting in the Late Middle Ages and thereafter, some believed that witches applied these ointments or ingested these potions to help them fly to gatherings with other witches, meet with the Devil, or to experience bacchanalian carousal.

References

Further reading
 Heiser, Charles B. Jr (1969). Nightshades, The Paradoxical Plant, 131-136. W. H. Freeman & Co. SBN 7167 0672-5.
 Thompson, C. J. S. (reprint 1968). The Mystic Mandrake. University Books.
Muraresku, Brian C. (2020). The Immortality Key: The Secret History of the Religion with No Name. Macmillan USA.

External links

Erowid Mandrake Vault

Mandragora in Wildflowers of Israel

Deliriants
Solanaceae
Medicinal plants
Herbal and fungal hallucinogens
Magic (supernatural)
Mythological plants
Mythological human hybrids
Plants in the Bible
Witchcraft